The Mihrişah Sultan Complex is a külliye (Ottoman charitable foundation) founded by Mihrişah Sultan in the late 18th century. The complex is located next to the Eyüp Sultan Mosque complex in Istanbul, Turkey. The complex's largest component is an imaret (soup kitchen) which is notable for being one of the last imarets in Istanbul to still serve its original purpose. The rest of the complex is also notable for the founder's mausoleum and for its ornate street-facing sebil, all built in the Ottoman Baroque style.

Description 
Construction of the complex took place between 1792 and 1796 and was commissioned by Mihrişah Sultan, the mother of Sultan Selim III. The complex is located next to the  Eyüp Sultan Mosque in the Eyüp neighbourhood of Istanbul. Selim III's reign (1789–1807) saw renewed Ottoman dynastic interest in this area, as he was responsible for rebuilding the Eyüp Sultan Mosque between 1798 and 1800. His mother's complex consists of a large imaret (soup kitchen) and a mektep (primary school), but from the street its most visible elements are a sebil and her mausoleum. This urban configuration was similar to the earlier Hamidiye Complex (partly demolished today) in the Eminönü neighbourhood, which was commissioned by Selim III's predecessor Abdülhamid I. The façade of the Mihrişah Sultan complex, with its vibrantly Baroque sebil and tomb, is one of the most notable exterior façade designs in Ottoman Baroque architecture and one of the grandest Ottoman charitable complexes from this period.

References

Citations

Bibliography 

 
 
 
 

Eyüp
Ottoman architecture in Istanbul
1796 establishments in the Ottoman Empire
Mausoleums in Turkey
Baroque architecture in the Ottoman Empire
Ottoman mausoleums